Alfred Drabits (born 6 April 1959) is a retired Austrian footballer who played as a forward.

Honours

Austrian Cup
 1981-82
 1985-86

Austrian Football Bundesliga
 1983–84
 1984–85
 1985–86

References

External links
 
 

1959 births
Living people
Austrian footballers
Association football forwards
Wiener Sport-Club players
FK Austria Wien players
First Vienna FC players
Austria international footballers
People from Lilienfeld District
Footballers from Lower Austria